CBC Thunder Bay refers to:
CBQT-FM, CBC Radio One on 88.3 FM
CBQ-FM, CBC Radio 2 on 101.7 FM
CBC Television is broadcast on a private affiliate, CKPR-TV on channel 2

SRC Sudbury refers to:
CBON-FM-20, Première Chaîne on 89.3 FM
CBLFT-18, Télévision de Radio-Canada on channel 12, rebroadcasts CBLFT